Magician or The Magician may refer to:

Performers
 A practitioner of magic (supernatural)
 A practitioner of magic (illusion)
 Magician (fantasy), a character in a fictional fantasy context

Entertainment

Books
 The Magician, an 18th-century novel by Leitch Ritchie
 The Magician (Maugham novel), a 1908 novel by Somerset Maugham
 The Magicians (Priestley novel), a 1954 novel by J. B. Priestley 
 The Magician (Stein novel), a 1971 young adult novel by Sol Stein
 The Magicians, a 1976 novel by James E. Gunn
 The Magician: The Secrets of the Immortal Nicholas Flamel, a 2008 novel by Michael Scott
 The Magicians (Grossman novel), by Lev Grossman, published 2009
 Magician (Feist novel), a 1982 novel in the Riftwar series by Raymond E. Feist
 The Magician, a 2021 novel by Colm Tóibín

Films
 The Magician (1898 film), a French short directed by Georges Méliès
 The Magician (1900 film), a silent film by Thomas Edison
 The Magician (1926 film), a horror directed by Rex Ingram
 The Magician (1949 film), a Mexican comedy
 The Magician (1958 film), a drama directed by Ingmar Bergman
 Magician (1967 film), a Soviet film directed by Pyotr Todorovsky
 Magicians (1982 film), a Soviet film directed by Konstantin Bromberg
 The Magician (1993 film), a crime drama directed by Terry Winsor
 Magicians, 2000 film directed by James Merendino
 The Magician, a film by Azerbaijani director Ogtay Mirgasimov that won Best Film at the inaugural  Golden Minbar International Film Festival in 2005
 The Magicians, 2005 South Korean film directed by Song Il-gon
 The Magician (2005 film), an Australian crime drama directed by Scott Ryan
 The Magician (2006 film), a Turkish comedy drama directed by Cem Yılmaz
 Magicians (2007 film), a 2007 comedy directed by Andrew O'Connor
 Magician: The Astonishing Life and Work of Orson Welles, a 2014 documentary directed by Chuck Workman
 The Magician (2015 film), South Korean period fantasy film directed by Kim Dae-seung

Television
 The Magician (American TV series), an American series that aired in 1973–1974
 The Magician (French TV series), an animated series that aired in 1999
 The Magicians (British TV series), a British series that aired from 2011 to 2012
 The Magicians (American TV series), a series based on the Lev Grossman novel that aired in 2015–20
 "Magician", the live-action segment of the 14th episode of The Super Mario Bros. Super Show!
 "The Magician" (Arrow episode), fourth episode of the third season of Arrow
 The Magician (Arrowverse character), an alias of Malcolm Merlyn from the television series Arrow

Music
 The Magician (album), a 1976 album by Timmy Thomas
 The Magician (musician), Belgian DJ and music producer Stephen Fasano 
 "Magician" (song), by Ice Prince from the 2011 album, Everybody Loves Ice Prince
 The Magicians (band), American garage rock band
 The Magician (EP), 2009 EP by Said the Whale

Other
 Magician (Marvel Comics), fictional characters appearing in the comics
 Magician (video game), a 1990 action role-playing game
 Magician, a character from Douglas Adams' 1982 novel Life, the Universe and Everything

Sport
 Canterbury Magicians, a New Zealand women's cricket team
 Harlem Magicians, an American basketball entertainment enterprise similar to the Harlem Globetrotters
 Minnesota Magicians, an American ice hockey team
 Mumbai Magicians, an Indian field hockey team

Other uses
 The Magician (nickname), a list of people
 The Magician (Tarot card)
 Magician (horse), an Irish Thoroughbred racehorse
 HTC Magician, a mobile phone
 Operation Magician, a British police operation connected to the 2000 Millennium Dome attempted robbery

See also
 Little Magician (disambiguation)
 Mage (disambiguation)
 Magic (disambiguation)
 Magus (disambiguation)